Kupres can refer to:

 Kupres, Canton 10, a town and municipality in Federation of Bosnia and Herzegovina, Bosnia and Herzegovina
 Kupres, Republika Srpska, a municipality in Republika Srpska, Bosnia and Herzegovina
 Kupres, Busovača, a village in Bosnia and Herzegovina

See also
 Battle of Kupres (disambiguation)